The Spice Networks are a group of television channels operated on a pay-per-view basis that broadcast adult and pornographic content. The channels are owned by MindGeek, but they were originally launched by Playboy Enterprises in March 1994. They are available via cable, IPTV, and satellite in over 72 countries including the United States and formerly New Zealand.

History
The channels first launched in November 1994. By 2005, there were seven channels in the family: Spice, Spice 2, The Hot Network, The Hot Zone, Spice Hot, Spice Live, and Spice Platinum. There were several international networks in the family as well, which included Private Spice in European territories, Spice TV Korea, Spice and Spice 2 in New Zealand, and Adult Channel, Playboy TV UK, Playboy One, and Spice Extreme in the United Kingdom.

On November 1, 2006, the US channels were renamed Fresh!, Shorteez, ClubJenna and Spice Xcess. The other three networks were shut down. The New Zealand network was renamed Spice Xcess around the same time. In late 2009, Shorteez was renamed to SKiN TV. The UK channels also saw changes around this point – Spice Extreme was removed from the Sky EPG in March 2010, while Playboy One later saw a rebranding to Paul Raymond TV, Top Shelf TV and My Ex-Girlfriends.

In November 2011, Playboy Enterprises sold the Spice Networks, along with the namesake Playboy TV channel, and the operating rights to Playboy's websites (excluding the Playboy Cyber Club, which was later shut down) to Manwin (now MindGeek). In January 2013, the US networks rebranded with the names of brands owned by MindGeek – Brazzers TV, BangU, RKTV and Mofos. The international networks were later rebranded as well, with Private Spice becoming Brazzers TV Europe and RKTV, My Ex-Girlfriends becoming Babes and Brazzers, and Spice Xcess in New Zealand rebranding under Brazzers TV which later ceased broadcasting. The South Korean version of Spice TV remains the only Spice Networks channel that still broadcasts under the name.

References

External links
 Playboy Enterprises Inc.: Corporate Overview archived 26 March 2006
 Brazzers TV Europe Program Guide

MindGeek
Television pornography
Television networks in the United States
Defunct television channels in New Zealand
Television channels and stations established in 1994
Pornographic television channels